The George B. Sohier Prize, established by Bostonian businessman Waldo Higginson in 1890, is a $250 annual award for the best thesis of approximately 10,000 words or text submitted by a student of English or Modern Literature at Harvard University or Radcliffe College.  Resident graduate students attending Harvard Graduate School of Arts and Sciences are also eligible for the prize. Higginson’s $6,500 grant,  later increased to $7,000, was given with the stipulation that the prize money would be drawn from its annual interest and that any surplus would go toward Harvard University Library for the purchase of books. It was also understood that the annual prize would not be awarded if the Harvard Faculty of Arts and Sciences deemed there were no suitable entries for that year. Waldo Higginson (1814–1894) graduated from Harvard in 1833 and had given the grant to honor his brother-in-law, George Brimmer Sohier (1832–1877), an 1852 Harvard graduate.

Early recipients

References

American literary awards
Awards established in 1890